The 2006–07 Calgary Flames season began with a great deal of promise following the acquisition of top forward Alex Tanguay from the Colorado Avalanche.  The other major off-season news was that Darryl Sutter promoted his assistant coach, Jim Playfair, to head coach as Sutter stayed with the team as general manager only.

A pre-season favorite to win the National Hockey League's Northwest Division, the Flames struggled out of the gate in October before a six-game winning streak, and a franchise record ten consecutive home wins in November and December, brought the Flames back into contention in the tight Northwest Division.

A January crash proved that the Flames were unable to live up to the pre-season hype. Hoping to rejuvenate the team, GM Sutter orchestrated a trade with the Los Angeles Kings to bring Craig Conroy back to the team. However, there was a lack of passion even after the mid-season shake-up. The Flames struggled to an eighth-place finish in the Western Conference, having to stave off a furious challenge for the final playoff spot by Colorado.  The Flames entered the 2007 Stanley Cup Playoffs with a first-round match-up against the Detroit Red Wings, falling in six games to the Red Wings.

The lackluster season and poor playoff performance led to widespread criticism of rookie head coach Jim Playfair. TSN analyst Bob McKenzie even suggested replacing Playfair after game two of the Flames playoff series against Detroit.  Following the season, however, several players defended their coach.  Despite this, Playfair was relieved of his duties prior to the 2007–08 season.

Regular season
Two Flames were named to the roster for the 2007 All Star Game: goaltender Miikka Kiprusoff and defenceman Dion Phaneuf.  It was the first appearance for both.  Jarome Iginla would have been named to the team as well, but his knee injury kept him out of the game.

On February 3, 2007, the Flames made history by having young Cree singer Akina Shirt perform "O Canada" in Woodlands Cree, the first time the national anthem had ever been performed in an Aboriginal language at a major league sporting event.

On February 6, the Flames retired Mike Vernon's #30.  Vernon, who was instrumental in the Flames trip to the Stanley Cup Finals in 1986 and their Cup victory in 1989 became the second Flame to have his number raised to the rafters, preceded only by Lanny McDonald.

The Flames entered the stretch drive by re-acquiring fan favorite, and former Flame, Craig Conroy in a deal with the Los Angeles Kings, then by completing a significant trade with the Boston Bruins, acquiring defenceman Brad Stuart along with Wayne Primeau for Chuck Kobasew and Andrew Ference.

On February 24, Jarome Iginla scored his 315th career goal, moving him past Joe Nieuwendyk into second on the Flames all-time goal scoring list. Theoren Fleury was the Flames all-time leading scorer at 364 goals.  Miikka Kiprusoff broke Dan Bouchard's franchise record for career shutouts as a Flame when he recorded his 21st in a 1–0 shootout victory against the Minnesota Wild on March 27.

The Flames were not shut out in any of their 82 regular-season games.

Season standings

Schedule and results

Playoffs
The Flames qualified for the playoffs for the third consecutive season.  Calgary entered the 2007 Stanley Cup Playoffs as the 8th seed in the Western Conference and started on the road against the top ranked Detroit Red Wings.  The Flames were unable to defend against the Wings' ferocious attack, with goaltender Miikka Kiprusoff facing an average of 42 shots per game during the series as Calgary fell to Detroit in six games.

Game five, in Detroit, ended with a series of nasty incidents as the Flames' frustration got the better of them.  Upset with Detroit's constant bumping of Miikka Kiprusoff throughout the series, and angry with what they believed was an illegal, low-bridge hit by Brett Lebda on Daymond Lankow late in the 5–1 loss, the Flames lashed out.  First Langkow delivered a quick punch to the face of Lebda following that hit, and later backup goaltender Jamie McLennan delivered a two-handed slash to Wings forward Johan Franzen after only being in goal for eighteen seconds.  McLennan received a match penalty for the slash, and was suspended five games by the NHL.  Head coach Jim Playfair was fined $25,000, and the Flames organization $100,000.  Franzen would exact a measure of revenge for the hit in game six by scoring the winning goal in double overtime that eliminated the Flames.

The Flames were not shut out in any of their 6 playoff games.

Player statistics

Skaters
Note: GP = Games played; G = Goals; A = Assists; Pts = Points; PIM = Penalty minutes

†Denotes player spent time with another team before joining Calgary.  Stats reflect time with the Flames only.
‡Traded mid-season

Goaltenders
Note: GP = Games played; Min = Minutes played; W = Wins; L = Losses; OT = Overtime/shootout losses; GA = Goals against; SO = Shutouts; SV% = Save percentage; GAA = Goals against average

Awards and records

Records
10 game home winning streak (November 7 – December 12); previous record was 9, set five times.
21 career shutouts as a Flame: Miikka Kiprusoff (March 27 at Minnesota).

Milestones
300 assists: Jarome Iginla (December 5 vs Carolina).
300 goals: Jarome Iginla (December 7 at Minnesota).
600 points: Jarome Iginla (December 7 at Minnesota).
100 wins: Miikka Kiprusoff (January 9 vs Minnesota).

Transactions
The Flames were involved in the following transactions during the 2006–07 season.

Trades

Free agents

Draft picks
Calgary's picks at the 2006 NHL Entry Draft in Vancouver, British Columbia.  The Flames picked 26th overall for the second consecutive draft.

Statistics are updated to the end of the 2013–14 NHL season. † denotes player was on an NHL roster in 2013–14.

Farm teams

Omaha Ak-Sar-Ben Knights
The 2006–07 AHL season was the second for the Ak-Sar-Ben Knights.  The Knights finished a top the Western Conference standings, winning the West Division with a 49–25–5–1 record, earning their first playoff appearance. Omaha was upset in the first round of the Calder Cup playoffs by the Iowa Stars, however, losing four games to two.

Following the season, rumours swirled around the future of the team, which ranked at or near the bottom of league attendance in its first two seasons, and lost us$4 million over two years.  The rumour would quickly be confirmed as the Flames announced that the team was leaving Nebraska for the Quad Cities of Iowa and Illinois to become the Quad City Flames for the 2007–08 season.

Las Vegas Wranglers
The Las Vegas Wranglers finished the 2006–07 ECHL season as the league's top club with a 46–12–1–8 record.  Their 106 points narrowly edged out the 105 point total of the Alaska Aces.  The Wranglers swept the Phoenix RoadRunners in their first round, but were upset by the Idaho Steelheads in the second, falling four games to two.

See also
2006–07 NHL season

References

Player stats: Calgary Flames player stats on espn.com
Game log: Calgary Flames game log on espn.com
Team standings: NHL standings on espn.com

Calgary Flames seasons
Calgary Flames season, 2006-07
Cal